Tamalco Township is one of nine townships in Bond County, Illinois, USA.  As of the 2020 census, its population was 522 and it contained 260 housing units.

Geography

Cities
 Keyesport (northwest half)

Unincorporated towns
 Hookdale
 Keyesport Landing
 Tamalco

Cemeteries
The township contains these four cemeteries: Duncan, McKendree, Payne and Saint Peters.

Major highways
  Illinois State Route 127
  Illinois State Route 143

Lakes
 Carlyle Lake

Demographics
As of the 2020 census there were 522 people, 310 households, and 230 families residing in the township. The racial makeup of the township was 95.79% White, 0.00% African American, 0.19% Native American, 0.38% Asian, 0.00% Pacific Islander, 0.19% from other races, and 3.45% from two or more races. Hispanic or Latino of any race were 1.15% of the population.

There were 310 households, out of which 38.70% had children under the age of 18 living with them, 60.97% were married couples living together, 12.26% had a female householder with no spouse present, and 25.81% were non-families. 23.90% of all households were made up of individuals, and 15.20% had someone living alone who was 65 years of age or older. The average household size was 2.03 and the average family size was 2.32.

The township's age distribution consisted of 17.6% under the age of 18, 2.9% from 18 to 24, 11.7% from 25 to 44, 39.8% from 45 to 64, and 28.0% who were 65 years of age or older. The median age was 54.0 years. For every 100 females, there were 78.2 males. For every 100 females age 18 and over, there were 74.4 males.

The median income for a household in the township was $44,000, and the median income for a family was $42,278. Males had a median income of $45,100 versus $19,195 for females. The per capita income for the township was $22,945. About 2.2% of families and 11.1% of the population were below the poverty line, including 32.4% of those under age 18 and 3.4% of those age 65 or over.

School districts
 Bond County Community Unit School District 2
 Carlyle Community Unit School District 1
 Mulberry Grove Community Unit School District 1

Political districts
 Illinois' 19th congressional district
 State House District 102
 State Senate District 51

References
 
 United States Census Bureau 2007 TIGER/Line Shapefiles
 United States National Atlas

External links
 City-Data.com
 Illinois State Archives

Townships in Bond County, Illinois
1888 establishments in Illinois
Townships in Illinois